American Herro is a biographical documentary film about Herro Mustafa, an American diplomat and senior adviser on the Middle East to Joe Biden when he was Vice President.

The documentary covers Herro's early childhood as a Kurdish-Muslim refugee from Iraq as she fled with her family from Iraqi Kurdistan while under Saddam Hussein's regime to Minot, North Dakota, as well as her academic success and successful career as a diplomat stationed in Bosnia, Turkey, Iraq, and elsewhere. The documentary features home video footage of Mustafa's family in Iraq, photography from her childhood, and modern interviews with family, coworkers, and her trip back to Iraq.

External links 
 
 

2009 films
American documentary films
Kurdish-American history
Kurdish-language films
Documentary films about refugees
2009 documentary films
Documentary films about families
2000s American films